Norristown Farm Park is a  Pennsylvania state park in East Norriton and West Norriton Townships and the Borough of Norristown, Montgomery County, Pennsylvania, in the United States. Located just off of Interstate 276 on West Germantown Pike, it is operated in partnership with the Montgomery County Department of Parks. 

A working farm on the site of Norristown State Hospital, the park has multiple colonial-era farm buildings and homes on its grounds. 

Stony Creek flows through the park. Baseball, bicycling, cross-country skiing, hiking, fishing, and picnicking opportunities are available in the park, as are summer musical concerts.

History
Norristown Farm Park was originally part of a  tract of land called "Williamstadt," which originally belonged to William Penn. The property was then transferred to Isaac Norris, the namesake of Norristown, by way of Penn's son, William Penn, Jr. Norris' heirs sold pieces of Williamstadt to the Commonwealth of Pennsylvania and Norristown State Hospital was opened in the 1870s as a mental hospital. The park is on state-owned land that surrounds the hospital.

Gallery

Nearby state parks
The following state parks are within  of Norristown Farm Park:
Benjamin Rush State Park (Philadelphia County)
Bull's Island Recreation Area (New Jersey)
Evansburg State Park (Montgomery County)
Delaware Canal State Park (Bucks and Northampton Counties)
Delaware and Raritan Canal State Park (New Jersey)
French Creek State Park (Berks and Chester Counties)
Fort Washington State Park (Montgomery County)
Fox Point State Park (Delaware)
Neshaminy State Park (Bucks County)
Nockamixon State Park (Bucks County)
Marsh Creek State Park (Chester County)
Ralph Stover State Park (Bucks County)
Rancocas State Park (New Jersey)
Ridley Creek State Park (Delaware County)
Tyler State Park (Bucks County)
Washington Crossing State Park (New Jersey)

References

External links

  
 Norristown Farm Park - official Montgomery County site
 Farm Park Preservation Association

State parks of Pennsylvania
Farm Park
Protected areas established in 1995
Parks in Montgomery County, Pennsylvania
Protected areas of Montgomery County, Pennsylvania
1995 establishments in Pennsylvania